Keith Carlton Robertson (1914–1991) was an American writer of children's books and murder mysteries. He was a former captain in the United States Navy.

Biography
Keith Robertson was born on May 9, 1914 in Dows, Iowa. He joined the Navy in 1931, and served as a radioman on a destroyer. Later, he attended the United States Naval Academy, graduating with a B.S. degree. He attributed his initial decision to study at the Academy to a "fanatical aversion to washing dishes." He said, "When I discovered that midshipmen at the United States Naval Academy did not wash dishes but were gentlemen by act of Congress, I promptly applied for entrance." Robertson served in World War II as captain of a destroyer. He was awarded five battle stars. He retired from the service as a captain in the United States Naval Reserve.

Robertson published his first book, Ticktock and Jim, in 1948. His writing career spanned 40 years. As a member of the Rutgers University Council on Children's Literature, he was active in encouraging aspiring authors.

He was married to Elizabeth Woodburn Robertson, a rare-book dealer, and had four children. He died of cancer at his home in Hopewell, New Jersey on September 23, 1991, aged 77.

Writing career
Keith Robertson is best known for the five books of the Henry Reed series, beginning in 1958 with Henry Reed, Inc., which won the William Allen White Children's Book Award in 1961. Another Henry Reed book, Henry Reed's Baby-Sitting Service, also won this award, along with the Pacific Northwest Library Association Young Readers' Choice Award, in 1969. The Henry Reed series was illustrated by Robert McCloskey.

Keith Robertson used the pseudonym Carlton Keith for his six murder mysteries.

Selected bibliography
Ticktock and Jim (1948)
Ticktock and Jim, Deputy Sheriffs (1949) 
The Dog Next Door (1950)
The Year of the Jeep (1968)
In Search of a Sandhill Crane (1972)
Tales of Myrtle (1974)

The Neil and Swede books AKA the Carson Street Detective Agency series
The Mystery of Burnt Hill (1952)
Three Stuffed Owls (1954)
The Crow and the Castle (1957)
The Money Machine (1969)

The Henry Reed books
Henry Reed, Inc. (1958)
Henry Reed's Journey (1963)
Henry Reed's Baby-Sitting Service (1966)
Henry Reed's Big Show (1970)
Henry Reed's Think Tank (1986)
The Adventures of Henry Reed omnibus (1982)

Carlton Keith books
The Diamond-Studded Typewriter  aka A Gem of a Murder (1958)
Missing, Presumed Dead aka The Missing Book-keeper (1961)
Rich Uncle (1963)
The Hiding Place (1965)
The Crayfish Dinner aka The Elusive Epicure (1966)
A Taste of Sangria (1968)

References

External links
 
 
 Carlton Keith at LC Authorities, with 7 records

1914 births
1991 deaths
20th-century American novelists
American children's writers
American male novelists
American mystery writers
Deaths from cancer in New Jersey
People from Hopewell, New Jersey
Novelists from Iowa
Novelists from New Jersey
United States Navy officers
20th-century American male writers
Military personnel from New Jersey
United States Navy personnel of World War II
United States Naval Academy alumni